Michael Aastrup Jensen (born 16 March 1976 in Roskilde) is a Danish politician, who is a member of the Folketing for the Venstre political party. He was elected into parliament at the 2005 Danish general election.

Political career
Aastrup Jensen been politically active since he as a 14-year-old joined the Young Liberals and the Liberal Party in Randers. In subsequent years he held various positions within these organizations.

In 1998-2006 he was a Member of Randers municipal council and was appointed mayor in 2002. At the time he became the youngest mayor ever in Denmark.

Member of Parliament, 2005–present
Aastrup Jensen has been a Member of Parliament for the Liberal Party since 2005.

Since the 2015 Danish elections, Aastrup Jensen has been his parliamentary group's spokesman on foreign affairs. He is also a member of numerous committees, including the Danish delegation to the Parliamentary Assembly of the Council of Europe. In this capacity, he has been serving as Vice-President of the Assembly (since 2015) and as member of the Committee on the Honouring of Obligations and Commitments by Member States of the Council of Europe (Monitoring Committee). Alongside Kastriot Islami of Albania (2010-2011) and Boris Tsilevitch of Latvia (2012-2015), he also served as the Assembly's co-rapporteur on the monitoring of Georgia between 2010 and 2015.

External links 
 Biography on the website of the Danish Parliament (Folketinget)

References 

Living people
People from Roskilde
1976 births
Venstre (Denmark) politicians
Mayors of places in Denmark
Danish municipal councillors
Members of the Folketing 2005–2007
Members of the Folketing 2007–2011
Members of the Folketing 2011–2015
Members of the Folketing 2015–2019
Members of the Folketing 2019–2022
Members of the Folketing 2022–2026